Gerardo Gaudiano Rovirosa (born 10 January 1981) is a Mexican politician affiliated with the PRD. He currently serves as Deputy of the LXII Legislature of the Mexican Congress representing Tabasco.

See also
 List of municipal presidents of Centro Municipality, Tabasco

References

1981 births
Living people
Politicians from Tabasco
Members of the Chamber of Deputies (Mexico)
Party of the Democratic Revolution politicians
21st-century Mexican politicians
Universidad Iberoamericana alumni